Sharon Bhagwan-Rolls is a Fijian political activist of Indian descent.  She is the Technical Adviser of Shifting the Power Coalition, a humanitarian organization headed by Pacific women. She is also the former coordinator of the FemLINKPACIFIC,  a women's media organization based in the capital of Suva, which she founded in September 2000 in response to the 2000 Fijian coup d'état. In addition to her numerous other functions, Rolls has served as the Media Focal Point for the Pacific Region of the Global Partnership for the Prevention of Armed Conflict was appointed the Gender Liaison of the International Steering Group of GPPAC in October 2009.

Since November 2000, femLINKPACIFIC and Bhagwan Rolls have been campaigning for the implementation and integration of UN Security Council resolution 1325, titled Women, Peace and Security, in order to ensure women's full participation in the peace and security sector toward ensuring sustainable peace and democracy in Fiji. In March 2010, she was appointed by the United Nations to the Civil Society Advisory Group on UNSCR1325/Women, Peace and Security. She presented a Pacific perspective to High level Commitment to Action on SCR 1325 event at the UN on September 25, 2010.

Bhagwan Rolls and femLINKPACIFIC have also introduced a mobile women's community radio station (femTALK 89.2fm) in Fiji in 2004, as way to take radio to women in local communities, providing a relevant information and communication platform to increase women's visibility and issues in decision making forums. Earlier, together with co-founder, Peter Sipeli, Bhagwan-Rolls produced a number of community videos. The video "Balancing the Scale" won the Fiji Human Rights Commission television award.
She continues to serve as the Producer/Director of FemLINKPACIFIC's Community video productions including The Thirteen 25 Diary: Her'stories (2010) which was launched in New York (October 2010) in conjunction with the Australia and Papua New Guinea missions to the United Nations, as part of the 10th anniversary of UNSCR1325

Rolls was known as a strong critic of the military coup which deposed the Qarase government on 5 December 2006, and of human rights violations allegedly committed by soldiers since then.

She also called on her fellow Indo-Fijians to "follow the footsteps of Mahatma Gandhi" and oppose the coup, saying that Gandhi preached friendship, forgiveness, love, tolerance, and non-violence.  “Nothing has been achieved through violence and weapons and I believe that we just lose lives of our loved ones under gun point,” she told the Fiji Sun on 10 December 2006.

Rolls was the principal organizer of the "Blue Ribbon" campaign to restore democracy following the previous coup, in May 2000.  Later, she opposed controversial legislation introduced by the Qarase government in 2005 to provide for amnesty for persons convicted of coup-related offences.

References

External links 
 Femlink website

Fijian people of Indian descent
Living people
Year of birth missing (living people)